Constance Rousseau (born 13 August 1989) is a French actress. She appeared in more than twelve films since 2007.

Selected filmography

Cinema 
 2007: All is forgiven by Mia Hansen-Løve – young Pamela
 2011: Kataï (short film) by Claire Doyon – Lucie
 2011: Un monde sans femmes (medium length film) by Guillaume Brac – Juliette
 2012: Pisseuse (short film) by  Géraldine Keiflin
 2013: Simon Killer by Antonio Campos – Marianne
 2014: L'Année prochaine de Vania Leturcq – Clothilde
 2016: Daguerrotype by Kiyoshi Kurosawa – Marie Hégray
 2019: Deux fils by Félix Moati – Iris
 2021: Cette musique ne joue pour personne by Samuel Benchetrit - Roxane

Television 
 2009: Le Bourgeois gentilhomme by Christian de Chalonge – Lucile
 2011: La Mauvaise Rencontre by Josée Dayan – Marianne
 2014: Ceux de 14 (mini-série) by Didier Dolna and Olivier Schatzky

References

External links 

1989 births
Living people
French film actresses
Actresses from Paris